The Journal of Social Development in Africa is a biannual peer-reviewed academic journal which focuses on social development issues as they affect the poor and marginalized in Sub-Saharan Africa.

External links 
 

Development studies journals
African studies journals
English-language journals
Biannual journals
Publications established in 1986